

Events
 The annual American Philosophical Association Eastern Division meeting: January 5–8 in Baltimore, Maryland (originally planned for Montreal).

Deaths
 October 9 – Bruno Latour, French philosopher, anthropologist and sociologist (b. 1947)

References

2022-related lists
Philosophy by year
21st-century philosophy